Santa Barbara's Moreton Bay Fig Tree located in Santa Barbara, California is believed to be the largest Ficus macrophylla in the United States. 

A seaman visiting Santa Barbara in 1876 presented a seedling of an Australian Moreton Bay fig tree to a local girl who planted it at 201 State Street. After the girl moved away a year later, her girlfriend, Adeline Crabb, transplanted the tree to the corner of Montecito and Chapala streets, just a few blocks from the ocean, on land then owned by the Southern Pacific Transportation Company.  The tree was officially designated as a historic landmark in 1970, and the property was deeded to the City of Santa Barbara in 1976. The tree has since been placed on the California Register of Big Trees. The roots are protected by a chain barrier the size of the canopy. The tree may be viewed at the Amtrak Train Station, 209 State Street.

See also
 List of individual trees

References

External links
https://blogs.chapman.edu/huell-howser-archives/2001/01/08/trees-californias-gold-3013/ 30-min video: Huell Howser visits the fig free in a 2001 episode of California's Gold].

Individual fig trees
Individual trees in California
Natural history of Santa Barbara County, California
Tourist attractions in Santa Barbara, California